"Foul Cats" is the first single from American hip hop artist Kool G Rap's 1998 album Roots of Evil.

Background
The song tells the story of Kool G Rap being set up and his friend murdered by a rival gang. Seeking revenge, G Rap and his crew kidnap the girlfriend of one of the rival gangsters at gunpoint and force her to reveal her boyfriend's place of residence. They go to his home in Jackson Heights, Queens where they find him sleeping on the sofa and awaken him by throwing a glass of whisky in his face. They then discover his heroin stash and kill him by giving him a fatal heroin overdose. When his girlfriend reaches for the phone and attempts to call for help, G Rap is forced to pistol-whip her and shoot her dead before he and his crew flee the premises.

Samples
"Foul Cats" samples the following songs:
"Poor Abbey Walsh" by Marvin Gaye

Track listing
A-side
 "Foul Cats" (Radio Edit)
 "Foul Cats" (Instrumental)

B-side
 "Foul Cats" (Album Version)
 "Foul Cats" (Acapella)

References

External links
 "Foul Cats" at Discogs

1998 singles
Kool G Rap songs
Songs written by Kool G Rap
Gangsta rap songs
1998 songs